Miray (Miri) is the district center of Andar District, Ghazni Province, Afghanistan.

Miray has one high school, Sultan Shahabudden Ghori, and one small hospital there, and a bazaar.

See also
 Ghazni Province

Populated places in Ghazni Province